These collegiate women's beach volleyball teams compete as members of the National Collegiate Athletic Association (NCAA). Currently, 93 college athletic programs sponsor the sport, with one more to do so in a future season. The majority of the participating programs are members of Division I, though some members of divisions II and III also compete. Unlike in most sports for which the NCAA holds championships, one beach volleyball championship is held, made open to members of all three divisions.

Current teams
As of the 2023 season, these schools sponsor a beach volleyball team that is recognized by the NCAA. All institutions on this list are located within the United States. Conference affiliations reflect those for beach volleyball, and do not necessarily match the schools' primary conferences.

Future teams 
In addition to those listed above, one university will begin sponsoring a beach volleyball team for the 2025 season.

References 

NCAA Division I women's volleyball Programs
Beach Volleyball, Womens
Beach volleyball